Weevils are a fictional extraterrestrial species from the British science fiction television series Torchwood, first appearing in the episode "Everything Changes" (2006). As Jack Harkness explains in that episode, the name "Weevil" is applied to them by Torchwood, but as communication with them is limited, the true name of their race is not known. The behind-the-scenes documentary series, Torchwood Declassified, describes them as the "resident alien of the show". Torchwood Three has a captive Weevil which Owen studies. Jack first considered the name Barbara, but "It didn't seem right" so they named it Janet.

Characteristics
Weevils are thought to be extraterrestrial in origin, but a population of a few hundred live in the sewers of Cardiff, having travelled through a spacetime rift running through the city. They usually live off sewage, but occasionally one will go rogue, come to the surface and attack humans using their sharp fangs. They typically are seen wearing Torchwood embroidered boiler suits, so it is probable that they frequently escape from the facility. In "Everything Changes", a Weevil kills a hospital porter, but is captured and imprisoned in the Torchwood Hub. Jack also states that the frequency of these attacks has been increasing, but the cause is still as yet unknown. In the Torchwood Declassified episode accompanying "Combat", John Barrowman speculates that Weevils attack humans out of fear that they will be lured into the Weevil fight clubs. The tie-in website, a fictional radio station DarkTalk.co.uk  features call-ins from Cardiff locals who have begun to notice the existence of the Weevils.

The Torchwood website states that 1930s New York City suffered an infestation similar to the Weevil infestation of Cardiff, which was covered up by the well-known urban legend of sewer crocodiles. The Torchwood website also speculates they may have been in the sewer pipes of 4th century Byzantium, where they were described as "crocodile-like creatures".

The website also noted that they are of low-level intelligence, and that they have little or no language, but perhaps communicate telepathically. It notes that, while they attack to kill, it is unclear whether this is simply due to a desire for food. It points out that family/group behaviour is noted, accompanied by a territorial aggression. They are adapted to survive in dark, damp conditions, and possess great strength and speed. The episode "End of Days" establishes that in addition to being telepathic, Weevils are also "time sensitive", physically pained by dramatic disruptions in the spacetime rift. "Combat" also reveals that the Weevils are becoming immune to "anti-Weevil spray", leading some Torchwood team members to ask if they are "evolving in other ways", which suggests that Weevils have a strong ability to rapidly adapt to their environment.

Another Weevil, nicknamed 'Janet', appears in a deleted scene from the episode "Greeks Bearing Gifts", where it is shown being put into a cell. According to Jack Harkness, it was captured while burying its child. It briefly appears later in the episode when Toshiko Sato, disillusioned by the glimpses into others' minds provided by the telepathic necklace, compares humanity to Weevils, noting incredible similarity. Other appearances include "Combat", "Sleeper" and "Reset". On the latter occasion, Janet was shown as being afraid of Beth's presence.

In the Torchwood episode "Combat", the 'Weevil Fight Club' owner, Mark Lynch, theorises that the Weevils are mankind in the future when all that is left is rage; although the Torchwood website says that researchers in the 1950s noted they didn't appear to be derived from any known Earth-species, however, many planets in the Doctor Who universe contain humanoid aliens. Throughout "Combat", the rights of a Weevil over a human are questioned, specifically by Toshiko Sato. She questions Jack Harkness' decision to let 'Janet' the Weevil loose in order to lure the owners of the 'Weevil Fight Club', despite knowing 'Janet' may be treated badly by them. In the closing scene of "Combat", Owen Harper hisses in a Weevil-like manner at Janet and the fight-club individual, in their adjoining cells, and they both respond by cowering away.

The Weevils seem to have some strange connection to Death.  In "Dead Man Walking" they are shown to bow down in fear to Owen while he is possessed by Death. In "Exit Wounds" they are still shown to have that same fear of Owen, as he is "King of the Weevils". He is able to go through the streets, unlike Toshiko and Ianto.

In an episode of Torchwood Declassified John Barrowman said that the Weevils might be a calm race but kill when they feel threatened.  Weevils can't swim; one drowned after Jack, Gwen and Ianto chased one into Cardiff Bay in "Lost Souls".

In the Torchwood novel Risk Assessment, it is mentioned that at the Christmas Party, Ianto threw up over a Weevil.

Weevils appear in the Doctor Who episode "The Pandorica Opens" (2010). They appear alongside a number of alien species from the Doctor Who universe who unite to apprehend the Doctor.

Janet the Weevil was portrayed by actor Paul Kasey.

References

External links

Torchwood
Doctor Who races
Fictional characters who can move at superhuman speeds
Fictional characters with superhuman strength
Fictional elements introduced in 2006